Nambal may refer to the following populated places in Pakistan:
 Nambal, Punjab, near Rawalpindi
 Nambal, Khyber Pakhtunkhwa, in Abbottabad District